Joseph Stephens is an American multi-instrumentalist, film score composer, and songwriter.  He composed music for the television show The Righteous Gemstones, the film Observe and Report, directed by Jody Hill as well as the HBO series Eastbound & Down, produced by Will Ferrell and Adam McKay’s Gary Sanchez Productions.

Stephens is also a founding member of the band Pyramid, which provided the score for Hill’s feature film debut, The Foot Fist Way.  Pyramid also co-composed Shotgun Stories, from director Jeff Nichols, and composed additional music for Craig Zobel’s Great World of Sound.  Additionally, Stephens contributed original Pyramid songs to two David Gordon Green films; the Sundance Film Festival Special Jury Prize-winning All the Real Girls and the critically acclaimed Undertow.

Stephens is also a member of the band City Wolf, which covered the classic Pixies’ song “Where Is My Mind?” for Observe and Report.

Selected filmography
 2020: Never Have I Ever - Season 1 - Composer
 2020: Upload - Season 1 - Composer
 2020: Don't Tell a Soul - Composer
 2019: The Righteous Gemstones Season 1 - Composer
 2019: The Last O.G. Season 2 - Composer
 2019: Under the Eiffel Tower - Composer
 2018: The Take Off - Composer
 2018: The Last O.G. Season 1 - Composer
 2018: The Legacy of a Whitetail Deer Hunter - Composer
 2018: Arizona - Composer
 2017: Flower - Composer
 2017: Vice Principals  Season 2 - Composer
 2017: Shut Eye  Season 2 - Composer
 2016: Vice Principals Season 1 - Composer
 2014: Rat Pack Rat - Composer
 2013: Eastbound & Down  Season 4 - Composer
 2012: See Girl Run - Composer
 2012: Eastbound & Down  Season 3 - Composer
 2011: The Catechism Cataclysm - Composer
 2010: Eastbound & Down  Season 2 - Composer
 2009: Observe and Report - Composer
 2009: Eastbound & Down - Composer
 2007: Great World of Sound - Additional music by Pyramid
 2006: The Foot Fist Way - Music by Pyramid
 2004: Undertow - Contributed song "Monster In The Canyon"
 2003: All the Real Girls - Contributed songs "Streets Were Raining" and "Body On Fire"

References

External links
 
 

Living people
American film score composers
American male film score composers
American male songwriters
Year of birth missing (living people)